Aliens: Zone of Silence is a 2017 American direct to video found footage science-fiction psychological horror film directed by Andy Fowler in his directorial debut, and co written by Fowler and Fidel Arizmendi.

Premise
After Morgan's brother Hal vanishes from the Mexican desert, Morgan sets out to uncover the truth about his disappearance. When she discovers an extraterrestrial presence, she must risk her life to expose the desert's otherworldly secret.

Release
In the United States and Canada, Aliens: Zone of Silence was released direct to video on October 24, 2017.

Critical response
Footage Found Critic gave the film 9.5/10 stating it "elevates the found footage genre".

References

External links

2017 direct-to-video films
2017 horror films
American science fiction horror films
Found footage films
2010s science fiction horror films
American direct-to-video films
2010s English-language films
2010s American films